The Volutine stoneyian tabanid fly, Stonemyia volutina was a species of fly in family Tabanidae. It was endemic to the United States.

Sources 

Tabanidae
Insects of the United States
Insects described in 1892
Endemic fauna of the United States
Taxonomy articles created by Polbot
Taxobox binomials not recognized by IUCN